William Joyce (October 21, 1930 – September 3, 1998) was an American actor.

In 1959, Jack Webb picked him over Jimmy Dean to play the title role in a television adaptation of Johnny Guitar. That year he also played "Drew" in S1E11 of Bat Masterson.

A life member of The Actors Studio, Joyce's film roles included Senator Charles Carroll in The Parallax View and writer Tom Harris in I Eat Your Skin.

Filmography
Top Banana (1954) - Dancer (uncredited)
The Wings of Eagles (1957) - Naval Aide (uncredited)
This Could Be the Night (1957) - Bruce Cameron
Man on Fire (1957) - Chamberlain (uncredited)
Don't Go Near the Water (1957) - Lt. Boone (uncredited)
Have Gun Will Travel/Day of the Badman (1960) - Laredo
I Eat Your Skin (shot in 1964, released in 1971) - Tom Harris
The Young Nurses (1973) - Fairbanks
The Parallax View (1974) - Senator Charles Carroll 
Lifeguard (1976) - Lifeguard Captain

References

External links 

1930 births
1998 deaths
Male actors from Pennsylvania
American male film actors
20th-century American male actors